Vaporizing oil engine may refer to:

 spark ignition engine running on Tractor vaporising oil
 hot bulb engine
 Hornsby-Akroyd oil engine